Mikołaj Burda (born 8 July 1982) is a Polish representative rower. He is a five time Olympian competing at each Olympics from 2004 to 2020. He is the reigning world champion in the men's coxless four won at the 2019 World Rowing Championships.

References

External links
 

1982 births
Living people
Polish male rowers
Olympic rowers of Poland
Rowers at the 2004 Summer Olympics
Rowers at the 2008 Summer Olympics
Rowers at the 2012 Summer Olympics
Rowers at the 2016 Summer Olympics
Rowers at the 2020 Summer Olympics
Sportspeople from Toruń
World Rowing Championships medalists for Poland
21st-century Polish people